The 2002 California Secretary of State election occurred on November 5, 2002. The primary elections took place on June 4, 2002. State Assemblyman Kevin Shelley (D-San Francisco), the Democratic nominee, narrowly defeated the Republican, former State Assemblyman Keith Olberg (R-Hesperia). Shelley’s victory gave Democrats complete control of state government for the first time since before the Civil War.

Primary results
Final results from California Secretary of State.

Democratic

Candidates 

 Kevin Shelley, State Assemblyman

 March Fong Eu, Former Secretary of State and Former US Ambassador to Micronesia

 Michela Alioto, Former Aide to Al Gore, nominee for CA-01 in 1996 and Secretary of State in 1998
 Carl Henley
 Shawn Casey O'Brien

Republican

Candidates 

 Keith Olberg, former State Assemblyman (R-Hesperia)
 Mike Schaefer
 Barbara Jean Marr

Others

General election results
Final results from the Secretary of State of California.

Results by county

References

See also
California state elections, 2002
State of California
Secretary of State of California

2002 California elections
California Secretary of State elections
California
November 2002 events in the United States